Urnebes (meaning "disorder, mess") is a type of spread or salad characteristic of Serbian cuisine prominent in the city of Niš and southern Serbia. It is made of white cheese, kajmak and hot chili peppers, with salt and other spices. In Southern Serbia, it is made with chopped peppers, while ground dry peppers (aleva) are used elsewhere, giving it a red color. Depending on the type and amount of peppers, urnebes can range from mild to very hot. Usually, it is served as a side dish with grilled meat or barbecue. Sometimes garlic is used.

See also 
 Liptauer
 List of salads
 Serbian cuisine

References 

Cheese dishes
Salads
Serbian cuisine